Lough Neagh is a freshwater lake in Northern Ireland and is the largest lake in the island of Ireland, the United Kingdom and the British Isles. Its main inflows come from the Upper River Bann and River Blackwater, and its main outflow is the Lower River Bann. Its name comes from Irish  , meaning "Eachaidh's lake". The lough is owned by the Earl of Shaftesbury and managed by Lough Neagh Partnership Ltd.

Geography

Geology
Geologically the Lough Neagh Basin is a depression, built from many tectonic events dating back as far as 400 million years ago. These tectonic events are responsible for a NE-SW bedrock structure which  has controlled many subsequent events. During the Paleozoic era, the Lough Neagh Basin was a depositional graben.

Hydrology
Of the  catchment area, around 9% lies in the Republic of Ireland and 91% in Northern Ireland; altogether 43% of the land area of Northern Ireland is drained into the lough, which itself flows out northwards to the sea via the River Bann. As one of its sources is the Upper Bann, the Lough can itself be considered as part of the Bann.
Lough Neagh is fed by many tributaries including the rivers Main, Six Mile Water, Upper Bann, Blackwater, Ballinderry and Moyola

Islands and peninsulas
Coney Island
Coney Island Flat
Croaghan Flat
Derrywarragh Island
Kinturk Flat
Oxford Island (peninsula)
Padian
Ram's Island
Phil Roe's Flat
The Shallow Flat
Traad (peninsula)

Towns and villages
Towns and villages near the Lough include Craigavon, Antrim, Crumlin, Randalstown, Toomebridge, Ballyronan, Ballinderry, Moortown, Ardboe, Brockagh, Maghery, Lurgan and Magherafelt.

Counties
Five of the six counties of Northern Ireland have shores on the Lough (only Fermanagh does not), and its area is split among them. The counties are listed clockwise:

Antrim (eastern side and northern shore of the lake)
Down (small part in the south-east)
Armagh (south)
Tyrone (west)
Londonderry (northern part of west shore)

Local government districts
The area of the lake is split between four local government districts of Northern Ireland, which are listed clockwise:

 3 Antrim and Newtownabbey, in the north-east
 4 Lisburn and Castlereagh, in the east
 6 Armagh, Banbridge and Craigavon, in the south
 9 Mid Ulster, in the west

Management 
Lough Neagh is managed by Lough Neagh Partnership Ltd, a stakeholder group made up of elected representatives, land-owners, fishermen, sand traders and local community representatives.  Lough Neagh Partnership is responsible for the lough's conservation, promotion and sustainable development together with navigation of the Lough.

Uses
Although the Lough is used for a variety of recreational and commercial activities, it is exposed and tends to get extremely rough very quickly in windy conditions.

Water supply
The lough is used by Northern Ireland Water as a source of fresh water. The lough supplies 40% of the region's drinking water. There have long been plans to increase the amount of water drawn from the lough, through a new water treatment works at Hog Park Point, but these are yet to materialise.

The lough's ownership by the Earl of Shaftesbury has implications for planned changes to state-run domestic water services in Northern Ireland, as the lough is also used as a sewage outfall, and this arrangement is only permissible through British Crown immunity. In 2012, it was reported that the Earl is considering transferring ownership of the Lough to the Northern Ireland Assembly.

Navigation
Traditional working boats on Lough Neagh include wide-beamed  clinker-built, sprit-rigged working boats and smaller flat-bottomed "cots" and "flats". Barges, here called "lighters", were used until the 1940s to transport coal over the lough and adjacent canals. Until the 17th century, log boats (coití) were the main means of transport. Few traditional boats are left now, but a community-based group on the southern shore of the lough is rebuilding a series of working boats.

In the 19th century, three canals were constructed, using the lough to link various ports and cities: the Lagan Navigation provided a link from the city of Belfast, the Newry Canal linked to the port of Newry, and the Ulster Canal led to the Lough Erne navigations, providing a navigable inland route via the River Shannon to Limerick, Dublin and Waterford. The Lower Bann was also navigable to Coleraine and the Antrim coast, and the short Coalisland Canal provided a route for coal transportation. Of these waterways, only the Lower Bann remains open today, although a restoration plan for the Ulster Canal is currently in progress.

Lough Neagh Rescue provides a search and rescue service 24 hours a day and has 3 stations, situated around the lough. These are at Antrim, Ardboe and Kinnego Marinas, Kinnego being its headquarters and founding station. It is a voluntary service funded by the district councils bordering the Lough. Its members are highly trained and are a declared facility for the Maritime and Coastguard Agency which co-ordinates rescues on Lough Neagh.

Bird watching
Lough Neagh attracts birdwatchers from many nations due to the number and variety of birds which winter and summer in the boglands and shores around the lough.

Flora
The flora of the north-east of Northern Ireland includes the algae: Chara aspera, Chara globularis var. globularis, Chara globularis var. virgate, Chara vulgaris var. vulgaris, Chara vulgaris var. papillata, Tolypella nidifica var. glomerata. Records of Angiospermae include: Ranunculus flammula var. pseudoreptans, Ranunculus auricomus, Ranunculatus sceleratus, Ranunculatus circinatus, Ranunculatus peltatus, Thalictrum flavum, Thalictrum minus subsp. minus, Nymphaea alba, Ceratophyllum demersum, Subularia aquatic, Erophila verna sub. verna, Cardamine pratensis, Cardamine impatiens, Cardamine flexuosa, Rorippa palustris, Rorippa amphibia, Reseda luteola, Viola odorata, Viola reichenbachiana, Viola tricolor ssp. Violoa tricolor ssp. curtissi, Hypericum androsaemum, Hypericum maculatum, Elatine hydropiper, Silene vulgaris, Silene dioica, Saponaria officinalis, Cerastium arvense, Cerastium semidecandrum, Cerastium diffusum, Sagina nodosa, Spergularia rubra, Spergulaia rupicola, Chenopodium bonus-henricus, Chenopodium polyspermum.

Fishing
Eel fishing has been a major industry in Lough Neagh for centuries. These European eels make their way from the Sargasso Sea in the Atlantic Ocean, some  along the Gulf Stream to the mouth of the River Bann, and then make their way into the lough. They remain there for some 10 to 15 years, maturing, before returning to the Sargasso to spawn. Today Lough Neagh eel fisheries export their eels to restaurants all over the world, and the Lough Neagh Eel has been granted Protected Geographical Status under European Union law.

Nobel laureate Seamus Heaney produced a collection of poems A Lough Neagh Sequence celebrating the eel-fishermen's traditional techniques and the natural history of their catch.

Other fish species in the lake include dollaghan —a variety of brown trout native to the lake, salmon, trout, perch and pollan; bream, gudgeon, pike and rudd are also found, but are less common.

Human history

Name
The lough's English name derives . After the Plantation of Ulster, the English attempted to re-name the lake 'Lough Sydney' and 'Lough Chichester', in honour of the Lord Deputies, but these did not supplant the older name.

Mythology and folklore
In the Irish mythical tale Cath Maige Tuired ("the Battle of Moytura"), Lough Neagh is called one of the twelve chief loughs of Ireland. The origin of the lake and its name is explained in an Irish tale that was written down in the Middle Ages, but is likely pre-Christian. According to the tale, the lake is named after Echaid (modern spelling: Eochaidh or Eachaidh), who was the son of Mairid (Mairidh), a king of Munster. Echaid falls in love with his stepmother, a young woman named Ébliu (Ébhlinne). They try to elope, accompanied by many of their retainers, but someone kills their horses. In some versions, the horses are killed by Midir (Midhir), which may be another name for Ébliu's husband Mairid. Óengus (Aonghus) then appears and gives them an enormous horse that can carry all their belongings. Óengus warns that they must not let the horse rest or it will be their doom. However, after reaching Ulster the horse stops and urinates, and a spring rises from the spot. Echaid builds a house there and covers the spring with a capstone to stop its overflowing. One night, the capstone is not replaced and the spring overflows, drowning Echaid and most of his family, and creating Loch n-Echach (Loch nEachach, the lake of Eachaidh).

The character Echaid refers to the Dagda, a god of the ancient Irish who was also known as Echaid Ollathair (meaning "horseman, father of all"). Ébliu, Midir and Óengus were also names of deities. Dáithí Ó hÓgáin writes that the idea of a supernatural being creating the landscape with its own body is an ancient one common to many pre-Christian cultures. A Gaelic sept called the Uí Echach ("descendants of Echaid") dwelt in the area and it is likely their name comes from the cult of the god. They gave their name to the territory of Iveagh.

Another tale tells how the lake was formed when Ireland's legendary giant Fionn mac Cumhaill (Finn McCool) scooped up a chunk of earth and tossed it at a Scottish rival. It fell into the Irish Sea, forming the Isle of Man, while the crater left behind filled with water to form Lough Neagh.

History
In 839 the Vikings based a fleet on Lough Neagh, where they over-wintered in 840-1.

Sir Hugh Clotworthy settled from England near Antrim town in the reign of Elizabeth I and was granted the office of "Captain of Lough Neagh", with a stipend in return for maintaining boats on the lake to enforce royal authority. Clotworthy's successors as captain were his son and grandson-in-law, the first and second Viscounts Massereene.  In 1660 Charles II gave the first Viscount the rights to the fish and bed of the lake.

Gallery

See also

List of loughs in Ireland
Lough Beg
Portmore Lough
Lí Ban (mermaid) - another legend about the creation of the Lough

References

Further reading

External links

Discover Lough Neagh
Lough Neagh Heritage
Lough Neagh Rescue
BBC News on pollution
BBC News on ownership of Lough Neagh

 
Locations in Celtic mythology
Ramsar sites in Northern Ireland